The 1988 Pannill Sweatshirts 500 was a NASCAR Winston Cup Series race that took place on April 24, 1988, at Martinsville Speedway in Martinsville, Virginia.

Background
Martinsville Speedway is one of five short tracks to hold NASCAR races. The track's turns are banked at eleven degrees, while the front stretch, the location of the finish line, is banked at zero degrees. The back stretch also has a zero degree banking.

Race report
It took three hours and twenty-eight minutes for the race to reach completion. Jimmy Hensley managed to qualify Buddy Arrington's #67 Pannill Sweatshirts Ford in the top-10 for the Pannill Sweatshirts race. Mechanical failure put him on the sidelines on lap 290. This was Hensley's only Cup start of the season.

Harry Gant qualified in 3rd place but retired due to engine problems on lap 208.

Bobby Hillin Jr.'s third-place run was his only top-5 performance on a short track in Cup competition. 

Forty six thousand fans would watch Dale Earnhardt in his #3 Chevrolet Monte Carlo defeat Sterling Marlin in his #44 Oldsmobile Cutlass by almost two seconds. Earnhardt's other victory in the 1988 Winston Cup Series season came at the 1988 Motorcraft Quality Parts 500 near Atlanta, Georgia. 

Seven caution flags slowed the race for 46 laps. This race was the event where Richard Petty would receive one of his final last-place finishes of his career. Petty would receive his 15th and final last place finish at the 1989 Holly Farms 400 race at North Wilkesboro Speedway. Ernie Irvan (in his #2 vehicle) and Jimmy Means (in his #52 vehicle) both failed to qualify for the race.

Total winnings for this race were $295,315 ($ when adjusted for inflation) collectively spread throughout the qualifying drivers.

Top 10 finishers

Timeline
Section reference: 
 Start of race: Ricky Rudd started out the event with the pole position.
 Lap 38: Harry Gant took over the lead from Ricky Rudd.
 Lap 66: First caution of the event, ended on lap 75.
 Lap 67: Terry Labonte took over the lead from Harry Gant.
 Lap 68: Harry Gant took over the lead from Terry Labonte.
 Lap 87: Second caution of the event, ended on lap 94.
 Lap 206: Sterling Marlin took over the lead from Harry Gant.
 Lap 246: Third caution of the event, ended on lap 251.
 Lap 247: Buddy Baker took over the lead from Sterling Marlin.
 Lap 248: Sterling Marlin took over the lead from Buddy Baker.
 Lap 286: Fourth caution of the event, ended on lap 290.
 Lap 287: Bobby Hillin Jr. took over the lead from Sterling Marlin.
 Lap 292: Sterling Marlin took over the lead from Bobby Hillin Jr..
 Lap 312: Fifth caution of the event, ended on lap 318.
 Lap 313: Bobby Hillin Jr. took over the lead from Sterling Marlin.
 Lap 319: Dale Earnhardt took over the lead from Bobby Hillin Jr..
 Lap 393: Sixth caution of the event, ended on lap 396.
 Lap 405: Seventh caution of the event, ended on lap 410.
 Finish: Dale Earnhardt finished the event in first place.

Standings after the race

References

Pannill Sweatshirts 500
Pannill Sweatshirts 500
NASCAR races at Martinsville Speedway